Apollo Lynge (11 January 1940 – 7 July 2002) was a Danish cross-country skier. He competed in the men's 15 kilometre event at the 1968 Winter Olympics.

References

External links
 

1940 births
2002 deaths
Danish male cross-country skiers
Olympic cross-country skiers of Denmark
Cross-country skiers at the 1968 Winter Olympics
People from Nuuk
20th-century Danish people